The Alpes Adria Internet Exchange (AAIX) is an Internet exchange point situated in Klagenfurt, Austria. AAIX is a non-profit, neutral and independent peering point. The AAIX is sponsored and does not bill any cost for the connect. AAIX is also member of the European Internet Exchange Association.

See also 
 List of Internet exchange points
 List of Internet exchange points by size

External links 
 Alpes Adria Internet Exchange (official website)

References 

Internet exchange points in Austria
Internet in Austria